Mesosa obscura is a species of beetle in the family Cerambycidae. It was described by Charles Joseph Gahan in 1895. It is known from Myanmar, and possibly also China.

References

obscura
Beetles described in 1895